Tymnes is a genus of leaf beetles in the subfamily Eumolpinae. It is known from North America and Central America. There are at least nine described species in Tymnes.

Gallery

Species
These species belong to the genus Tymnes:
 Tymnes chrysis (Olivier, 1808) i c g b
 Tymnes guatemalensis Bechyné, 1955
 Tymnes metasternalis (Crotch, 1873) i c g b
 Tymnes omoplatus Lefèvre, 1885
 Tymnes oregonensis (Crotch, 1873) i c b
 Tymnes thaleia (Blake, 1977) i c g 
 Tymnes tibialis Bechyné, 1955
 Tymnes tricolor (Fabricius, 1792) i c g b
 Tymnes violaceus Horn, 1892 i c g 
Data sources: i = ITIS, c = Catalogue of Life, g = GBIF, b = Bugguide.net

References

Further reading

External links

 

Eumolpinae
Chrysomelidae genera
Beetles of North America
Beetles of Central America
Taxa named by Félicien Chapuis
Articles created by Qbugbot